Ara Qaleh (also Romanized as Ārā Qal‘eh) is a village in Bayat Rural District, Nowbaran District, Saveh County, Markazi Province, Iran. At the 2006 census, its population was 118, in 36 families.

References 

Populated places in Saveh County